Bobby Shew (born March 4, 1941) is an American jazz trumpet and flugelhorn player.

Biography
He was born in Albuquerque, New Mexico, United States. After leaving college in 1960, Shew was drafted into the U.S. Army and played trumpet and toured with the NORAD joint forces band stationed in Colorado Springs.  After leaving the Army, Shew joined Tommy Dorsey's band and then played with the Woody Herman and then the Buddy Rich big bands in the mid-to-late 1960s. He was a trumpeter in Tom Jones's band while in Las Vegas, and is featured on his 1971 live album Live at Caesar's Palace. In 1972, Shew moved from Las Vegas to Los Angeles, where he did much studio work as well as play with some of the top big bands of the era through the end of the 1970s: Akiyoshi/Tabackin, Louis Bellson, Maynard Ferguson, and others.  In addition to playing on several notable big band recordings starting in the 1960s, Shew recorded several albums as leader, starting with Debut in 1978.

Shew has mentored jazz musicians in New Mexico, and has led the Albuquerque Jazz Orchestra. He has taught a two-week workshop for high school students at the Skidmore Summer Jazz Institute in Saratoga Springs, New York. Shew also performs and teaches worldwide, including a two-week residency at the Graz University of Music in Austria in 2017. He has taught at leading European music schools in Austria, Germany, the Netherlands, Switzerland and also in Canada.

Discography

As leader
Debut (Disco Mate) 1978
Outstanding In His Field (Inner City) 1979
Class Reunion (Sutra) 1980
Play Song (Jazz Hounds) 1981
Telepathy (Jazz Hounds) 1982
Shewhorn (Pausa) 1983
Trumpets No End (Delos) 1983 – with Chuck Findley
Round Midnight (MoPro) 1984
Breakfast Wine (Pausa) 1985
Aim For The Heart (Gateway) 1987 – with the Wigan Youth Jazz Orchestra
Metropole Orchestra (Mons) 1988
Tribute to the Masters (Double-Time Records) 1995
Heavyweights (MAMA) 1996 – with Carl Fontana
Playing With Fire (MAMA) 1997
Salsa Caliente (MAMA) 1998
The Music of John Harmon (Sea Breeze) 2001
Play Music of Reed Kottler (Torii) 2002 – with Gary Foster "and friends"
Live in Switzerland (TCB) 2003 – Bobby Shew / George Robert Quintet
I Can't Say No (Four Leaf Clover) 2003
One in a Million (Sea Breeze) 2004 – recorded 1990 with The Groovin' High Big Band / Peter Fleischhauer
Cancaos Do Amor (Torii) 2007
LIVE 1983 (UF School of Music) 2015 -Recorded 1983 with University of Florida Jazz Band -Director Gary Langford

As sideman
With Louis Bellson
 The Louis Bellson Explosion (Pablo, 1975)
With Carmen McRae
Can't Hide Love (Blue Note, 1976)
With Rodger Fox Big Band
Heavy Company (Circular, 1981)
With Gerald Wilson
State Street Sweet (MAMA, 1995)

Honors
Outstanding in His Field - Grammy nomination (1980)

References

External links

 Official website

Bobby Shew at allaboutjazz.com
Bobby Shew at [ allmusic.com]
Bobby Shew equipment and discography
Bobby Shew Interview NAMM Oral History Library (2005)

1941 births
Living people
American jazz trumpeters
American male trumpeters
American jazz horn players
Musicians from Albuquerque, New Mexico
Pausa Records artists
Inner City Records artists
United States Army Band musicians
21st-century trumpeters
21st-century American male musicians
American male jazz musicians
Double-Time Records artists